The 2012 Chinese Taipei Open Grand Prix Gold was the eleventh grand prix gold and grand prix tournament of the 2012 BWF Grand Prix Gold and Grand Prix. The tournament was held in Hsing Chuang Gymnasium, Taipei, Taiwan October 2 until October 7, 2012 and had a total purse of $200,000.

Men's singles

Seeds

  Kenichi Tago (withdrew)
  Nguyen Tien Minh (champion)
  Dionysius Hayom Rumbaka (withdrew)
  Tommy Sugiarto (third round)
  Hu Yun (quarter-final)
  Wong Wing Ki (quarter-final)
  Alamsyah Yunus (first round)
  Daren Liew (third round)

Finals

Top half

Section 1

Section 2

Section 3

Section 4

Bottom half

Section 5

Section 6

Section 7

Section 8

Women's singles

Seeds

  Tai Tzu-ying (champion)
  Gu Juan (quarter-final)
  Yip Pui Yin (semi-final)
  Pai Hsiao-ma (semi-final)
  Chan Tsz Ka (first round)
  Xing Aiying (first round)
  Hera Desi (quarter-final)
  Tee Jing Yi (second round)

Finals

Top half

Section 1

Section 2

Bottom half

Section 3

Section 4

Men's doubles

Seeds

  Angga Pratama / Ryan Agung Saputra (final)
  Mohd Zakry Abdul Latif / Mohd Fairuzizuan Mohd Tazari (champion)
  Ricky Karanda Suwardi / Muhammad Ulinnuha (quarter-final)
  Markus Fernaldi Gideon / Agripinna Prima Rahmanto Putra (first round)

Finals

Top half

Section 1

Section 2

Bottom half

Section 3

Section 4

Women's doubles

Seeds

  Shinta Mulia Sari / Yao Lei (second round)
  Poon Lok Yan / Tse Ying Suet (second round)
  Vivian Hoo Kah Mun / Woon Khe Wei (semi-final)
  Suci Rizki Andini / Della Destiara Haris (final)

Finals

Top half

Section 1

Section 2

Bottom half

Section 3

Section 4

Mixed doubles

Seeds

  Muhammad Rijal / Debby Susanto (champion)
  Danny Bawa Chrisnanta / Vanessa Neo Yu Yan (quarter-final)
  Irfan Fadhilah / Weni Anggraini (second round)
  Riky Widianto / Richi Puspita Dili (semi-final)

Finals

Top half

Section 1

Section 2

Bottom half

Section 3

Section 4

References

Chinese Taipei Open
Chinese Taipei Open
Chinese Taipei Open
Sport in Taipei
BWF Grand Prix Gold and Grand Prix